Kazi Rabbi Hasan is a Jatiya Party (Ershad) politician and the former Member of Parliament of Joypurhat-2.

Career
Hasan was elected to parliament from Joypurhat-2 as a Jatiya Party candidate in 1988.

References

Jatiya Party politicians
Living people
4th Jatiya Sangsad members
Year of birth missing (living people)